Robin Haase and Philipp Oswald were the reigning champions from when the tournament was last held in 2019, but chose not to defend their title.

Fernando Romboli and David Vega Hernández won the title, defeating Tomislav Brkić and Nikola Ćaćić in the final, 6–3, 7–5.

Seeds

Draw

Draw

References

External Links
 Main Draw

Croatia Open Umag - Doubles